L. Bancel LaFarge (1900–1989) was an American architect.  He was a founding member of the New York City Landmarks Preservation Commission.

Early life and education
Louis Bancel LaFarge was born into a prominent American family. His grandfather, John LaFarge, was a noted American artist. His grandmother was a granddaughter of Commodore Oliver Hazard Perry and a direct descendant of Benjamin Franklin. His father, Bancel LaFarge, was an artist who continued his father's work in glass, and his brother Tom was a mural painter.

LaFarge was a graduate of Harvard College and the Yale School of Architecture. He married the advertising executive Margaret Hockaday, with whom he had three children: Timothy, Benjamin, and Celestine.

Career
LaFarge established himself as an architect in New York specializing in domestic architecture.  His practice was interrupted by military service in the Second World War.  At war's end, he returned to his work as an architect. At one time he served as president of the New York chapter of the American Institute of Architects (1958–1960), and he was a founding member of the New York City Landmarks Preservation Commission (1965–70).

World War II
Major LaFarge was assigned to the 7th Army in Europe during the Second World War.  He was the Chief of the Monuments, Fine Arts, and Archives (MFAA) section.  LaFarge was the first MFAA officer to arrive in France after D-Day in 1944.

See also 
 Roberts Commission
 Nazi Plunder
 Rescuing Da Vinci
 The Rape of Europa
 Monuments, Fine Arts, and Archives program
 Monuments Men Foundation for the Preservation of Art

Notes

References
 American Commission for the Protection and Salvage of Artistic and Historic Monuments in War Areas. (1946). Report. Washington, D.C.: U.S. Government Printing Office. 
 Nicholas, Lynn H. (1995).  The Rape of Europa: The Fate of Europe’s Teasures in the Third Reich and the Second World War. New York: Vintage Books. ; OCLC 32531154

Archival resources
  Charles Maurice Fleischner papers, Yale University Library, Manuscripts and Archives
 LaFarge Family Papers, Yale University Library

External links 
 PBS (Oregon Public Broadcasting):  "The Rape of Europa.", 2006 film, aired November 24, 2008
 Monuments Men Foundation: Monuments Men> LaFarge, Maj. L. Bancel
 Obituary: Flint, Peter B.  "L. B. La Farge, 89, an Architect," New York Times. July 4, 1989.

1900 births
1989 deaths
Harvard College alumni
Yale School of Architecture alumni
Art and cultural repatriation
Monuments men
United States Army personnel of World War II
20th-century American architects
United States Army officers
La Farge family
Members of the American Academy of Arts and Letters